The muddy arrowtooth eel, Ilyophis  brunneus, is a cutthroat eel in the family Synaphobranchidae. It is found around the world at depths below 1,000 m. Its length is up to 160 cm.

References

 
 Tony Ayling & Geoffrey Cox, Collins Guide to the Sea Fishes of New Zealand,  (William Collins Publishers Ltd, Auckland, New Zealand 1982) 

Synaphobranchidae
Fish described in 1891